Herbert Michael "Bert" Cremean (8 May 1900 – 24 May 1945) was an Australian politician. He was a Labor Party member of the Victorian Legislative Assembly for the districts of Dandenong (1929–1932) and Clifton Hill (1934–1945). He was Deputy Premier of Victoria for four days in September 1943.

Early life
Cremean was born in Richmond, an inner city suburb of Melbourne, in May 1900. His parents were Timothy Carton Cremean, a carpenter, and Cecelia Hannah O'Connell. He was educated at St Ignatius' School in Richmond and St Patrick's College in East Melbourne, and held a broad range of occupations including clerk, timberworker, machinist and tram driver.

Political career
Cremean's family were active in local Labor politics, with both his mother and uncle having served as mayor of the City of Richmond. Cremean joined Richmond Council in 1926, and was mayor from 1928 to 1929 during a time in which the council was split by factional rivalries. In 1929, Cremean sought preselection for the Victorian lower house seat of Richmond, but was defeated in controversial circumstances by Ted Cotter. Cremean then sought and won preselection for the seat of Dandenong, and defeated the incumbent Nationalist member and railways minister Frank Groves at the 1929 state election. Cremean represented Dandenong for one term, until Groves regained the seat for the United Australia Party at the election in 1932. Following his defeat, Cremean worked as an assistant purchasing officer for the Vacuum Oil Company.

In 1934, Cremean was preselected for the scheduled by-election for the seat of Clifton Hill, which was vacated by Maurice Blackburn who had resigned to contest the federal seat of Bourke. As the only candidate at the close of nominations, Cremean was elected unopposed.

In 1941, Cremean was instrumental in the founding of "The Movement"—a consolidation of Catholic trade unions devoted to fighting communism. Although he would not live to see the Australian Labor Party split of 1955 which resulted, Cremean was the person who suggested the formation of the group, and worked closely with B. A. Santamaria to organise it. In December 1942, Cremean authored and published a booklet, Red Glows the Dawn: A History of the Australian Communist Party, under the pseudonym Michael Lamb, warning of communist tactics and infiltration of the Labor Party.

In 1943, Cremean was appointed Deputy Premier of Victoria and Chief Secretary in the short-lived First Cain Ministry, which lasted less than four days before having its commission withdrawn after the Governor refused to dissolve the parliament on Premier John Cain's request.

Death
In 1945, Cremean underwent surgery for a long-standing colonic fistula at Mount St Evin's Hospital in Fitzroy, but he contracted peritonitis and died on 24 May.

Cremean's death triggered a by-election for Clifton Hill, at which his brother, Jack Cremean, was elected.

References

External links
Red Glows the Dawn, Cremean's anti-communist booklet

1900 births
1945 deaths
Members of the Victorian Legislative Assembly
Deputy Premiers of Victoria
Australian Labor Party members of the Parliament of Victoria
Mayors of places in Victoria (Australia)
Australian anti-communists
Australian Roman Catholics
Deaths from peritonitis
People from Richmond, Victoria
Politicians from Melbourne